Nawab Ghazanfar-Jang, Bangash Khan (1665 – 1743) was the first Nawab of Farrukhabad in Uttar Pradesh, India. He was a "Bawan Hazari Sardar" (Commander of 52,000 men strong force) in the Mughal Army. He served as governor of Malwa and Allahabad provinces of the Mughal empire.
He was also viceroy of Assam from 1735-1743. Although regarded as rude and illiterate he was well regarded for his loyalty, and it is believed that had fortune sided with him he would have been able to establish a kingdom rivalling those in the Deccan or Awadh.

Life
Muhammad Khan belonged to the Karlani Khaghzai clan of the Pashtun Bangash tribe. In India they were referred to as qaum-i-bangash. His father, Ain Khan Bangash had migrated from his native lands in the time of Aurangzeb and settled in Mau Rashidabad. Muhammad Khan gained a reputation as one of the most powerful of the Afghan mercenary warriors who inhabited that part of Hindustan, and eventually came to establish the territories that were consolidated into the state of Farrukhabad. He was rewarded the jagir of Farrukhabad area and part of Bundelkhand.

The state of Farrukhabad was named after Muhammad Khan's patron the Emperor Farrukhsiyar. In 1713, he was appointed a courtier by Emperor Farrukhsiyar and founded the town of Farrukhabad in 1714.  He founded the town of Mohammadabad after his name and the town of Qaimganj after his son Qaim Khan's name. During Saadat Khan's journey to Awadh, he stayed at Farrukhabad. Muhammad Khan Bangash gave him information about the strength of Shaikhzadas (a community which ruled Lucknow). He advised Khan to befriend the sheikhs of Kakori, adversaries of the Shaikhzadas, before entering Lucknow. Bangash became Saadat Khan's  closest ally. However, Saadat Khan began to go out of his ways to curry favour with the emperor. This obsession annoyed other nawabs and subahdars. Among them was Bangash himself, who was angry at the latter for backing Chhatrasal and instigating him.

He served in the campaign against the Jat leader Churaman (October 1722 - September 1723) and Ajit Singh of Marwar. In 1730, emperor Muhammad Shah appointed him as the Subahdar of Malwa. However, he was unable to cope with the repeated Maratha incursions and was removed from the post in 1732. He was appointed Subahdar of Allahabad for the admirable job he did against Chhatrasal the first time. On account of his failure in Bundelkhand against Chhatrasal the second time, he was removed from the governorship of Allahabad as well.

At his death his dominions included the entire Doab from Koil in the North, to Kora in the South, including 
all of Farrukhabad and parts of Cawnpore, Shahjahanpur, Budaun and Aligarh.
His brother Himmat Khan Bangash was the father of Nawab Murtaza Khan of Jahangirabad, and the grandfather of the poet Nawab Mustafa Khan Shefta.

Personality
Muhammad Khan Bangash was illiterate and could not understand a single word of Persian, due to which he had to be accompanied by one of his sons. Contemporaries were amazed by the discrepancy between his great wealth & power and his simple personal habits. However, this roughness and general lack of adab could be rather embarrassing, especially during audiences at the imperial Mughal court. His descendants were more fully accommodated to the royal nawabi lifestyle and the etiquette of an Indo-Persian court.

Later Mughal-Maratha Wars

In Bundelkhand, Chhatrasal had rebelled against the Mughal Empire and established an independent kingdom. In December 1728, a Mughal force led by the distinguished commander Muhammad Khan Bangash attacked him, and besieged his fort with his family. Chhatrasal had repeatedly sought Peshwa Baji Rao's assistance, but the latter was busy in Malwa at that time.

In March 1729, the Peshwa Baji Rao I finally responded to Chhatrasal's request and marched towards Bundelkhand. Chhatrasal also escaped his captivity and joined the Maratha forces. After they marched to Jaitpur, as a result Bangash was defeated in the battle and retreat from Bundelkhand. Chhatrasal's position as the ruler of Bundelkhand was restored.

Succession
Muhammad Khan Bangash was succeeded by his eldest son Qaim Khan in 1743. Qaim Khan was later succeeded by Ahmad Khan Bangash, his younger brother and Muhammad Khan Bangash's second son.

Nawabs
These were the following Nawabs of Farrukhabad-
 Nawab Muhammad Khan Bangash
 Nawab Qaim-Jang Qaim Khan Qaim-ud-daula
 Nawab Ahmad Khan Bangash (took part in the Third Battle of Panipat in 1761 alongside Ahmad Shah Abdali )
 Nawab Muzaffar-Jang Daler Himmat Khan
 Nawab Nasir-Jang Imdad Hussain Khan
 Nawab Tafazzul Hussain Khan

References

Bibliography

People from Farrukhabad
Nawabs of India
Mughal Empire
1743 deaths
1665 births